Sexual assistance is the support for people with functional diversity so that they can have sexual access to their own body. Some people with disabilities may not have mobility in their hands so, as they can not masturbate, they may need someone's help to perform sexual activities on their own body.

Controversies 
While for defenders of sexual assistance this practice allows people with disabilities to exercise their own sexual rights, in the same way that other forms of assistance allow them to live independently, other positions consider that it is a form of prostitution that, just as any other, is exploitation and should be abolished.

See also 
 Attraction to disability
 Masturbation
 Personal assistant
 Sexuality and disability
 Sexual surrogate
 Sex therapy
 Sex work
 Yes, We Fuck!

External links 

 European Platform Sexual Assistance
 Asistencia Sexual.

References

Prostitution
Sexuality
Disability and sexuality